Sange Muzhangu is a 1972 Indian Tamil-language thriller film, directed by P. Neelakantan, starring M. G. Ramachandran, with S. A. Ashokan, Lakshmi, Cho Ramaswamy, among others enacting supporting roles. Kamal Haasan worked under K. Thangappan as his dance assistant in this film. It is a remake of the Bengali film Jiban Mrityu.

Plot 
Murugan is an innocent guy who meets Latha in airport. They start off with a fight but fall in love. he is also a fugitive who is trapped in the murder of his employer by Natarajan and Varagaswamy. He is on the run. With help from Pratap Singh he takes the place of Kripal Singh, who is Pratap's sister's son scheduled to appear for IPS from London had died in an accident. He writes and clears the exams and is assigned to investigate Murugan's case.

He takes up the role, investigates and in the end exposes the real culprits.

Cast 

The casting is established according to the original order of the credits of opening of the movie, except those not mentioned.

Soundtrack 
The music was composed by M. S. Viswanathan.

References

External links 

1970s Tamil-language films
1972 films
Films directed by P. Neelakantan
Films scored by M. S. Viswanathan
Films with screenplays by K. S. Gopalakrishnan
Tamil remakes of Bengali films